Echo is a 2003 short film, written and directed by Tom Oesch, starring Haven Pell, Sean Le and Armand Kirshman.

Overview
The film tells the story of a young American soldier's heartbreak, guilt and eventual madness while fighting in the jungle of Vietnam.

It features black-and-white cinematography by Kevin Oeser and a film score by Sasha Ivanov.

In 2004 Echo won at the "46th Rochester International Film Festival".

References 
 
 Tom Oesch official site

2003 short films
2003 films
2000s English-language films
American short films
Vietnam War films
American war films
2000s American films